Legend of a Rabbit: The Martial of Fire ( Tùxiá zhīqīng lí Chuánshuō) also known as Rise of the Rabbit in the United Kingdom is a 2015 Chinese animated action adventure film directed by Ma Yuan and Dong Dake, the sequel to Legend of a Rabbit. It was released on February 21, 2015.

Plot
It has been a couple of years since Tu defeated Slash. Tu is now regarded as the protector of the village, defeating bandits and upholding justice. However, with no skills, Tu has to start training to harness the kung fu skills he inherited from the grandmaster. One day, Fu rescues an old injured warrior who turns out to be the evil Zhan. Zhan is badly injured and Fu decides to keep him safe because Zhan told him that he is in danger. This is just a plan as Zhan plans to take over the world of martial arts by acquiring a martial of fire from Lan of Huell Clan. Lan is the leader of Huell clan, who are the guardians of Martial of fire, and nobody can cross the barrier between martial and the temple of fire. Zhane fools Tu because only Tu, after getting the powers of Grandmaster Ape, can cross the barrier. Fu fails to save Laun and the martial of fire, and realizes he is just a lucky rabbit who happened to inherit the grandmaster's kung fu, but Penny encourages him to practice and go for it. He starts to practice hard with Laun and Penny, as they both know kung fu very well. Becky is also eventually able to join them in stopping Zhan's evil plan, as Becky has been thrown in a valley by Zhane. This finally makes Fu able to overthrow Zhan by holding the true harmony of the martial of fire.

Voice cast
Huang Lei as Tu
Yang Zishan as Bai Lan
He Yunwei as Biggie
Wang Jinsong as Zhan Tian
Wang Yuebo as Aman
Ma Yuan as Ajian
Zhao Huishan as Peony
Zhou Qixun as Shifu
Wang Di as Yuan
Li Xiaochen as Chuan
Zhang Yixin as Shan
Li Zhou as Jia and Xiaochun

Reception
The film earned  at the Chinese box office.

Awards

See also
Legend of a Rabbit

References

2015 films
2015 animated films
2015 action films
2010s adventure films
Chinese computer-animated films
Chinese action adventure films
Animated action films
Animated adventure films
Animated films about rabbits and hares
Animated films about cats